This is a list of bus companies that are operating in the Philippines. These companies may manufacture buses, build bus coaches and provide public transport bus service.

Brands and manufacturers

 Daewoo Bus – bus manufacturer headquartered in Busan, South Korea
 Golden Dragon – Chinese joint venture company established in 1992 in developing, manufacturing and selling 5m to 18m long luxury buses and light vans with trade mark of "Golden Dragon"
 Higer Bus – China's leading exporter of buses and coaches,
 Hino Motors – Japanese manufacturer of commercial vehicles and diesel engines, including trucks, buses and other vehicles
 Hyundai Motor Company – South Korean multinational automotive manufacturer
 Isuzu Motors – Japanese commercial vehicles and diesel engine manufacturing company headquartered in Tokyo. Its principal activity is the production, marketing and sale of Isuzu commercial vehicles and diesel engines.
 Iveco – is an Italian industrial vehicle manufacturing company based in Turin, Italy. It designs and builds light, medium and heavy commercial vehicles, quarry/construction site vehicles, city and intercity buses and special vehicles for applications such as firefighting, off-road missions, the military and civil defence.
 King Long – bus manufacturing company in Xiamen, Fujian province, People's Republic of China
 MAN Truck & Bus – the largest subsidiary of the MAN SE corporation and one of the leading international providers of commercial vehicles
 Mercedes-Benz buses – has been making buses since 1895 in Mannheim in Germany. Since 1995, the brand of Mercedes-Benz buses and coaches is under the umbrella of EvoBus GmbH, belonging 100% to the Daimler AG.
 Mitsubishi Fuso Truck and Bus Corporation – German-owned, Japan-based manufacturer of trucks and buses
 Scania AB
 Sunlong Bus
 UD Trucks – previously known as Nissan Diesel, its principal business is the manufacture and sales of light, medium and heavy duty diesel trucks, buses, bus chassis and special-purpose vehicles
 Volvo Buses – the world's largest bus manufacturer, with a complete range of heavy buses for passenger transportation
 Wuzhoulong
 Yutong – conglomerate based in Zhengzhou, Henan province, China focused on bus manufacturing as the core business, construction machinery and real estate as the strategic business and at the same time giving attention to other investment portfolios.
 Zhongtong Bus – Zhongtong produces tranditional energy/new energy buses and school buses, and RV vehicles.

Body manufacturers and re-manufacturers
 Auto Bus Transport Industries, Inc. (under JAC Liner)
 Almazora Motors Corporation
 Andel PhilMotor
 Aspire Manufacturing and Rebuilding
 Autodelta Coach Builders, Inc./Bataan Automotive Re-manufacturing (BAR), Inc.
 AutoTransform Corporation
 Columbian Manufacturing Corporation (CMANC)
 Del Monte Motor Works, Inc.
 Five Star Bus Body
 JK Motors Phils. Corp.
 JSPG Bus Body
 KOYO Bus Body Manufacturing
 Hino Motors Philippines Corporation
 Santarosa Motor Works, Inc.
 Nissan Diesel Philippines Corporation (defunct)
 Trans-Oriental Motor Builders, Inc.`
 Transport Engineering and Bus Body Assembly Plant  (a division of Yanson Group of Bus Companies)

Bus lines and provincial tour operations
 AB Liner Inc. – based in Guinayangan, Quezon, it services to and from Metro Manila, Batangas and Quezon.
 Agila Bus Transport Corp. – plies Angat to Divisoria.The terminal in Divisoria is near Tutuban station
 Alabang Transport Service Coop. (Alabang TSC) or (ATSC) – plying from Pasay/Marikina/Alabang to Panay destinations and now serving to Guimaras.
 Alfonso Liner – plies Pasay To Alfonso via Tagaytay/Imus; with them is Ultrabus, plying the Manila-Eastern Visayas route.
 ALPS The Bus, Inc. – also known as AL Perez & Sons (ALPS). It operates from Cubao/Alabang/Buendia to Batangas, parts of Bicol Region, and Iloilo.
 AAB Bus Lines, Inc. – plies Ternate/Naic To Buendia and Zapote To Naic and Maragondon.
 Annil Transport – its former subsidiary of Yellow Bus Line, that operates in Davao City which is now under Davao Metro Shuttle.
 A. Arandia Line – a bus company owned by: Alan Arandia (Mayor of Pio Duran, Albay) plying from Cubao/Alabang to Bicol Region: Pio Duran, Albay; Donsol, Sorsogon
 Aurora Bus Line – plies Cabanatuan To Baler via Nueva Ecija–Aurora Road and Cabanatuan To Dingalan via Palayan–Laur-Gabaldon–Dingalan Road
 Baliwag Transit – a major bus company with operations mainly from and to Manila, Bulacan, Nueva Ecija, Pampanga, Pangasinan and Tarlac.
 Barney Auto Line Group of Companies (BALGCO) Transport – Commonly known as Barney Auto Lines. Travels from Alabang to parts of Bondoc Peninsula and southern Quezon Province, even reaching as far as Santa Elena, Camarines Norte.
 Ballesteros Bus Line Corp. – the other bus company founded in Cagayan Valley. Plies to Ballesteros, Cagayan, Aparri and Junction Luna.
 Batman Starexpress Corporation (BSC) – plies Nasugbu To Pasay/Batangas City (Inter-provincial route from Nasugbu) via Balayan/Lian/Tuy (Palico) /Tagaytay/Silang/Dasmariñas/Imus/Bacoor/PITX/SM MOA
 Bataan Transit – plies Cubao/Avenida to Balanga/Mariveles in Bataan And San Fernando in Pampanga And San Fernando In La Union
 Baes Express – plies Trece Martires to Pasay
 Batangas Lines – plies Batangas City to Lucena City
 Batangas Bus Transport Service Cooperative (BBTSC) a sister group companies from Ceres Transport Incorporated / from Cubao/Buendia/PITX to Batangas City/Batangas Pier/Batangas City Grand Terminal and SM City Lipa, Batangas. formerly Batangas Starexpress Corporation (BSC)/KL CNG Bus Transport Corp.
 Bicol Isarog Trans – is a bus conglomerate based in Bicol Region and is the sister company of Five Star. Bus companies under Bicol Isarog TSI are Isarog Line, RSL Bus Transport Corporation, Peñafrancia Tours and Travel Transport Inc., V.S. Pintados, Our Lady of Salvacion Bus Lines, St. Rafael Transport Lines, Legaspi St. Jude Transport Lines, Cherry Bus, and Florencia Transport Services Inc. with operations in Bicol Region, Eastern Visayas, and Palawan.
 Blessed Grace Express - plies Indang/Trece To Pasay/PITX/Baclaran
 Bobis Liner – plies Cubao/Pasay/Turbina to Legazpi/Tabaco/Daraga.
 Cagsawa Travel and Tours, Inc. – plies to Albay and Camarines Sur provinces in Bicol.
 Candon Bus Line – plies Avenida to Candon.
 Cavite Batangas Transport Service Cooperative (CBTSC) – plies Alfonso To Pasay/Lawton
 Celyrosa Express – plies Indang/Calatagan To Pasay
 Ciudadano Liner – plied from Roxas City – Tapaz
 Coda Lines – a bus company allied with GV Frorida (sharing stop-overs) and HM Trans (sharing their terminal in cubao). An overnight bus offering trips from Cubao to Bontoc/Sagada in Mountain Province.
 CUL Transport – Operated by Carolina Uy-Lam. Plied from Cubao to Sorsogon and other parts of Eastern Visayas.
 CEM Trans
 Dalin Bus Line/JD Dalin Transport — offers trips from Sampaloc, Manila to Cagayan province, particularly Aparri/Santo Niño/Solana/Tuguegarao City
 D' Biel Transportation Company – A bus company in Zamboanga City and has operations in Basilan.
 Dingalan Trans - plies Cabanatuan To Dingalan/General Nakar 
 D'Liner (Now BTQ Bus and EJV Transport) – plies Cabanatuan To Dilasag via Casiguran/Baler
 D' Rising Sun Transport – plies Baguio To Sagada, Bontoc and Besao.
 Dagupan Bus – Now under Genesis Bus, plies Dagupan, San Carlos, Alaminos, Lingayen, Cabanatuan and Baguio. Inter-provincial bus lines ply from Baguio to Dagupan and Cabanatuan.
 Davao ACF Bus Lines – Serves routes between Davao City and towns in Davao Occidental.
 Davao Metro Shuttle – Based in Davao, but has a wide range of provincial operations across Mindanao and Visayas. Under it are the subsidiaries Go-Mindanao and Annil Transport, with the latter serving city shuttle routes within the city of Davao.
 DLTBCo – Del Monte Land Transport Bus Company – with operations from Manila to Southern Luzon, Samar and Leyte provinces.
 Dionets Liner- plying Trece/Indang to Pasay/Lawton sister company of Lorna Express
 Dominion Bus Lines – formerly Times Transit, but a strike put it out of business until a company bought its remains from owner Santiago Rondaris and started a new company. Plies to Vigan City, Ilocos Sur and Bangued, Abra.
 Don Aldrin Transort Inc. (Metro Coastal Transport Inc.) – plying Trece to Pasay,Lawton,and Ayala Bus Terminal.
 Eaglestar Transit Corp. – Plying Manila to Samar and Leyte provinces. With them is Wega Transport Corp., which expands operations to Davao City.
 Elavil Tours Phils., Inc. – offers trips to various destinations in Bicol and Eastern Visayas. Also affiliated with them is AMV Travel and Tours.
 Elizabeth Joy Transport
 Erjohn & Almark – plies to Mendez/Tagaytay/Dasmariñas/Silang/Nasugbu To Lawton/Ayala Bus Terminal
 ES Transport – Plying Avenida/Cubao/Pasay to Cabanatuan N.E./San Miguel, Bulacan.
 Farinas Transit Company – the first bus company to introduce the Hi–Decker King Long XMQ6129. Operates on the part of Ilocos Region. Inter-provincial routes from Baguio to Laoag.
 Ferdinand Liner – Plying Trece Martires to Pasay 
 First North Luzon Transit – plies Cubao/Avenida to Dagupan, San Carlos, Urdaneta,Alaminos,San Isidro and Cabanatuan
 Five Star – is a bus conglomerate that plies from Manila to parts of northern and central Luzon. With them is Pangasinan Solid North Transit Inc. First North Luzon Transit Inc. and CISCO,Bataan Transit 
 Florencia Transport Services Inc. – an interprovincial bus company that plies from Naga City to Lagonoy in Camarines Sur. Affiliated with Bicol Isarog.
 Genesis Bus a bus company plies along Manila to Northern Luzon provinces. With subsidiaries, JoyBus and North Genesis (the former Dagupan Bus which then sold by Genesis Transport Service Inc. and JAC Liner Inc.). Plies from Manila to Baler, and Baguio to Cabanatuan.
 German Espiritu Liner Inc. – plies Bulakan and Balagtas from Cubao and Divisoria.
 GV Florida Transport – noted for their Pink flower livery, the first to introduce "Sleeper Bus". With GMW Trans as its subsidiary, it offers daily trips from Manila to Cagayan Valley and Ilocos Region.
 Goldtrans Tours – operated by Villegas Transit Corporation. Plies from Pasay to Oras, Eastern Samar.
 Golden Valley Bus Line Corporation
 Golden Bee Transport and Logistics Corporation - sister company of Baliwag Transit.
 Grand Courier
 HM Transport Inc. – is a bus company with headquarters in Metro Manila. They are also the bus company that serves for Ninoy Aquino International Airport. With them are affiliate companies like Silver Star, Worthy Transport Inc., and Calamba Megatrans, Inc. There also servicing as Shuttle Service. 
 Inocencio Aniceto Transportation – also known as St. Joseph. It is one of the most dominant bus companies in the 1970s and 1980s. Has operations in Northern Luzon, and currently left behind by its competitors. Plies to Dagupan, Alaminos, and San Carlos, Pangasinan.
 JAC Liner Inc. the largest bus company in terms of bus fleet size. Under their company are their affiliates: Fermina Express, (now absorbed to Pangasinan Solid North Transit, Inc.) Dagupan Bus Co., Inc., Lucena Lines, Pangasinan Solid North Transit, Inc., and Saulog Transit Inc.; with Laguna Express Inc., and Green Star Express Inc. (now absorbed to Lucena Lines) Plies to Laguna, Lucena and San Pablo.
 JAM Liner with affiliated companies like First Charter and Tours Transport Corporation. Phil Touristers Inc., JAM Liner, and Metro Rapid Transit Service Inc. (MyBus)
 Jasper Jean Services Inc. – plies Dasmariñas To Navotas via EDSA And Dasmariñas To SM Fairview via Commonwealth Avenue/Quezon Avenue/EDSA
 Joybus Trasport – plies Avenida/Pasay/Cubao to Cabanatuan/Baler/Baguio/Dau/Tarlac/Dingalan/San Jose/Balanga/Mariveles
 JRN Liner – plies the routes: Iloilo City – Dacuton and Roxas – Dacuton
 JVH Transport — offers trips from Metro Manila to Tabaco City in Albay and Bulusan/Gubat/Matnog/Pilar/Santa Magdalena in Sorsogon Kahok-Dianhok Express Corp.
 Joanna Jesh Transport 
 Kersteen Transport – Plies Amadeo To Lawton and Buendia via Tagaytay
 Laforga Trans – under by New Badoc Bus Operators Association. 
 Land Car Incorporated – a bus company operated in Davao Region.
 Librando Transit
 Luzon Cisco Transport – a sister company of Five Star, it offers trips from Pasay/Cubao to Cabanatuan, Guimba, and Talugtug in Nueva Ecija; Tarlac City; Alaminos and San Fabian in Pangasinan; Santa Cruz in Zambales; and Angeles and Mabalacat cities in Pampanga.
 CE(M) Trans 
 Mallen Trans
 Manny Transportation of Cagayan Inc. (Manny Trans)
 Maria de Leon – operating out of Ilocos Norte, it is dubbed "The Fastest Woman on the Road"
 Mencidor Tours
 Metro Cebu Autobus Corp.
 Narpin Transport
 New RL Transport Corp. – plies San Antonio to Divisoria.The terminal in Divisoria is near Tutuban station
 North Genesis Transport – plies Avenida/Pasay/Cubao To Baguio/Tarlac/Baler/Dingalan/Balanga/Mariveles/Cabanatuan/San Jose
 Northern Luzon Bus Lines Incorporated – plies Sampaloc to Baguio/Santiago City/Roxas, Isabela/Maddela, Quirino
 Nor Beli Jun Transit – formerly known as SEMTRAMPCO.
 N. Dela Rosa Liner – A Division of Dela Rosa Transit for their Provincial Operation. Operated by Rosauro Dela Rosa. With them is Dela Rosa Express. Plies Batangas, Lipa, and Lucena City from Alabang.
 OHAYAMI Trans – Its bus terminal is located in Sampaloc, Manila. With daily trips from Manila to Baguio, Banaue, and Solano. It also has its operations from Baguio to Banaue in Ifugao.
 Oster Liner – plies Balanga, Bataan to Robinsons Starmills, San Fernando, Pampanga
 Pabama Transport – a bus company based in Bukidnon, the first in the Philippines to introduce buses with on-board tablets and provincial tri-axle double-decker buses
 Pampanga Bus Company (PAMBUSCO) – plies towns in Pampanga from their terminus. Formerly known as La Mallorca PAMBUSCO.
 Partas – It is the choice of many travelers from the Ilocos provinces, Baguio, Abra and Mindoro Provinces going to Metro Manila. Also, inter-provincial routes ply from Baguio to Abra, Ilocos Sur, Ilocos Norte, La Union, Cagayan and Isabela provinces.
 Patt Zeus Express
 Philippine Island Bus Transport Cooperative – plying Pasay/Alabang to Iloilo
 Philippine Rabbit – once called "The King of the Road", but, after 50 or so years its routes and stops were reduced by a crippling strike. Limits the route to Angeles, Tarlac, Baguio, and Alaminos (Pangasinan).
 Philtranco – The oldest bus company In Asia and in the Philippines, it started in 1914; its former company name is Albert Louis Ammen Transportation Company (ALATCO) and Pantranco South Express Inc. With Philtranco is their affiliate Amihan Bus Lines (former AMA Transit).
 PP Bus Lines – the second bus company to ply the Manila-Davao City route after Philtranco. With them is Leyte Biliran Star Bus Corp., its sister company.
 P&O Transportation – travels from Alabang/Pacita Complex to Quezon Province. It has special trips from Araneta Center Bus Port to Naga City. (Not connected with P&O Maritime.)
 Queenics Transport – The fastest growing bus company owned by Quenisphere Capital
 Queen's Express Inc.
 Raymond Transportation Inc. – has trips to various locations in Camarines Sur, Albay, Sorsogon, and Masbate provinces. With them is MRR Transport Inc., which plies from Naga to Caramoan, and Infanta to Manila via Ungos Port in Real, Quezon.
 REM Liner
 RCJ Lines – an offshoot of the successful RCJ Trucking corporation. With them is RCJ Trans. Plies to Laoag and Vigan.
 RFV Tours
 Rizal MetroLink Inc. plies Tanay, Rizal to Cainta, Rizal, EDSA Crossing, Shaw in Mandaluyong and Quiapo Manila.
 RJ Express – plies Balagtas and San Isidro to Monumento,Caloocan.
 RMB Line Inc (Bicol Express Transport System Inc.) – owned and operated by Raul M. Buban of Albay.
 Road Master Transport – plying Dagupan – Tuguegarao.
 Rosing Transportation Inc – plies to Legazpi, Naga, Del Gallego. Owned and operated by Rosita Sodsod.
 RRCG Transport – plying Batangas – Alabang/Buendia operated by BusTV by Spin Manila Incorporated. It operates with its sister company, Southern Carrier Co. Inc. They have also routes in inter- Metro Manila and routes in Cainta and Taytay in Rizal.
 R.U. Diaz Trans.- A family owned Bus line that travels Bicol (Tabaco) to Metro Manila (Pasay, Cubao) and vice versa.
 R. Volante Line – offers Bicol-bound trips, particularly to Pilar, Sorsogon
 Saint Rose Transit – together with its sister company GPS Transport, it plies the Calamba-Lawton route. Several of their fleets are sold to JAM Liner Inc.
 Santrans – plies Cubao To San Quintin via Tayug and their city operation:Baclaran (via EDSA/NLEX)/Santa Cruz (via NLEX/Marilao) To Muzon/Sapang Palay (Now SQBLI Bus Lines. Operated By Five Star)
 San Agustin Transport Corp. – owned by Santiaguel/TAS Trans Group of Companies with operations along parts of Southern Luzon. Under their management were Saint Anthony Of Padua Transport Systems Inc., J.S. Vergara Lines(defunct), Batman Starexpress Corp. (Formerly South Luzon Crown Transport/Crow Transport), Erjohn & Almark Transit Corp., & Richford Bus Lines (a bus company formerly operated by Bocolan Liner Inc.,)
 Saulog Transit Inc. – a bus provincial bus company plies the routes from Baguio to Olongapo City, Cavite City, and Ternate, Cavite. Now under Genesis Bus Company.
 San Quintin Bus Line Inc.
 Sheena Express – Operated by Gabisan Shipping Lines.
 SMTSCI (Santa Maria Transport Service Cooperative Inc)
 South City Express Inc.
 South Star Express
 St. Joseph Express – sister company of GV Florida Transport. 
 St. Jude Transit – formerly under S. M. Buban Line but bought by Bicol Isarog Transport System Inc.; now known as Legaspi St. Jude, it offers trips to Legazpi and Tabaco cities in Albay and Virac in Catanduanes (with the latter via the port of San Andres)
 St. Martha Lines
 Sta. Lucia Express Inc. – plies to Candon To Manila
 Sta. Monica Transport Service Coop. (Sta. Monica TSC) (SMTSC) – plies Angat to Divisoria.The terminal in Divisoria is near Tutuban station
 Sunrays Bus Lines – a bus company based in Cebu.
 Super 5 Land Transport and Services Inc.
 Superlines – plies routes to Bicol Region and Bondoc Peninsula from Cubao. Its name was taken after the superhero Superman. It runs along with their sister company, Daet Auto Express Transit Inc. which plies up to Daet, Camarines Norte.
 SUPREME – an interprovincial bus company plying Batangas to Lucena.
 TAWTRASCO (Tabaco Women's Transport Service Cooperative) – plies to Legazpi and Tabaco cities in Albay and the municipality of Virac in Catanduanes (with the latter reached via direct ferries from Tabaco).
 TSF-TSCI (Tarlac San Fernando Transport Service Cooperative Inc.)
 Universal Guiding Star Bus Line – A newly formed provincial bus company now plying the Manila-Cagayan Valley route via Bulacan area, SCTEX, and TPLEX. It operates 50+ buses. (Sister company of Everlasting and Guardian Angels, a bus company with operations along the Metro Manila). Now operated by Heaven Blessed Bus Line Express Inc.
 Victory Liner – Although Victory Liner is the sister company of Five Star, it operates with its own management and operations. With them are their subsidiaries: Chona Patrick Bus Liner, Sta. Lucia Express, EMC-LBS, and Road Master Transport. It is one of the biggest bus companies in the Philippines in terms of fleet size. It offers daily trips from Metro Manila to the different provinces in Northern Luzon (Cagayan Valley, Central Luzon, Ilocos Region and Baguio).
 Viron Transit – owned by millionaire Santiago Rondaris' son; formerly operating as far as the second district of Ilocos Sur but has started to operate as far as Laoag and Bangued, Abra.
 Viva Aladdin Transit
 White Stallion Express
 Yanson Group of Bus Companies – a Bacolod-based company, and the owner of the bus brands like Ceres Liner, Rural Transit of Mindanao, Bachelor Express, Ceres Transport, Southern Star Bus Transit, Mindanao Star, Sugbo Transit, and Gold Star Bus Transit.
 Yellow Bus Lines Incorporated – the oldest bus line in Mindanao, and the second-largest in Mindanao with 200 units, its base terminals are in Koronadal and General Santos. It has been in operation for over 60 years.

Within Metro Manila
 A&D Express
 AC Trans – Owned by Alberto Carating. Operates between Malanday in Valenzuela and Baclaran in Parañaque City via Ayala. and Malanday – NAIA via EDSA
 Admiral Transport
 Alabang Metro Link – Plies from Navotas to Alabang.
 Alabang Transport Service Coop. (Alabang TSC) (ATSC)
 Alro Transport Corp.
 Apex Commuter Transport
 Arabia Boy Express – a bus company that is operated by Irene Alejandro, plying Alabang (Las Piñas) to Plaza Lawton (Manila) and also, plying from Baclaran to SM Fairview via EDSA Ayala And Provincial Route:Indang to Pasay formerly under Darla Andrea now ELMS Bus Liner
 Armi Josh Transport (formerly Aicer Trans)
 ARR Transportation Inc.
 AST Trans
 Baclaran Metro Link – plies from Malanday/Navotas to Baclaran
 Bagong Buhay Transport Service Cooperative (BBTSC) – sister company of Santrans.
 Bagong Silang Transport Service And Multipurpose Cooperative (BSTSMC) – plying Bagong Silang in North Caloocan to Sta.Cruz, Manila via Novaliches and Malinta Exit.
 BBL Trans./Balibago Bus Lines – plies Balibago/Pacita/Alabang to Lawton/Lrt Buendia/SM Fairview
 BCB Transport Inc.
 Bensan Trans Corporation – owned by TAS Trans Group of Companies, plying from Alabang/Pilar (Muntinlupa/Las Piñas) – Lawton/Sta.Cruz(Manila)
 BGC Bus (Bonifacio Transport Corporation, formerly The Fort Bus) – A project of Fort Bonifacio Development Corporation plying around Bonifacio Global City
 Bigaa Buslink Transport Inc. sister company of A.C. Trans
 Bovjen Transport Services Inc. – operated By Alberto Carating, also a sister company of A.C. Trans
 Buslink Transport Inc.
 CEM Trans – plies Alabang/FTI/Baclaran To SM Fairview/Navotas/Malanday/Grotto/Tungko/Palmera
 Cher Transport – plying Pacita Complex-Navotas via EDSA/SLEX/Susana Hits Exit
 Citylink Coach Services Inc. – an intercity bus company that traverses C–5 Road from Eastwood City, Libis Quezon City to Newport City, Villamor Air Base, Pasay (facing to NAIA Terminal 3). It is operated under First Oceanic Property Management Inc., an affiliate company of Megaworld Corporation.
 Cign Transport
 Citybus – a bus company based in Novaliches in Quezon City. It plies Novaliches to Alabang via Bicutan and Sucat. 
 Commuters Bus Corp.
 Corimba Express
 Darla Andrea
 Darj Trans Co. (Under RBM)
 DCOMMP Transport
 Dela Rosa Transit – sister company of N. Dela Rosa Liner
 Del Monte City Transit Corp. – plies Sapang Palay to Baclaran and to Sta Cruz, Manila
 Delta Transport Inc.
 Diamond Star Transit Services Inc.
 Diamond V-Eight Transport – plying SM Fairview – Baclaran via Quezon Ave
 Dragon Lotus Liner Corp. – plies Grotto To Baclaran
 Draven Bus
 DSN Transport – plies Pala-Pala To Navotas via Edsa
 EA Diamond Starline Corporation – formerly known as EL Palma Transport. With major route of Baclaran to Malanday and provincial route of Pasay to some parts of Visayas.
 E&E Royal Couple Bus Inc.
 Earth Star Express – sister company of ES Transport; has routes between Sapang Palay – Sta. Cruz, SM Fairview – Baclaran via Quezon Ave. and Alabang – SM Fairview
 EMBC or Eastern Metropolitan Bus Corporation – It plies the same route as Rizal Metrolink Inc.
 El Palma Bus Liner
 ELMS Bus Liner – the company plies from Alabang to Lawton. And also with them subsidiaries; Alabang Transport Service Cooperative (ATSC), Shem Transport and Arabia Boy Express.
 EOS Transport Corporation
 EPJ Transit
 ES Transport – Plying Sapang Palay to Sta Cruz via Bocaue/Sta. Maria in Bulacan and Malinta in Valenzuela and Baclaran to SM Fairview via Ayala,Quiapo,Lawton
 Everlasting Transport Co. (under Heaven Blessed Bus Line Express Inc.)
 Fairview Bus Inc. – plies from Baclaran to Fairview.
 Fermina Express – plies Baclaran – SM Fairview via Ayala, and Lagro – NAIA
 Franchesca Mae Grajiel Transport Inc.
 Fran-Vill Transit Inc. (formerly FVTI)
 Funride Transport (formerly WLH Trans/WLLH Liner/Maggi Liner) – operating from Plaza Lawton (Manila) – SM Southmall (Las Piñas) via Coastal Rd.
 Gasat Express – Plies from Alabang to Fairview. With a provincial route to Iloilo.
 G Liner – owned and operated by De Guia Enterprises Inc. It operates routes from Taytay and Cainta in Rizal to Quiapo, Manila via Manila East Road, Ortigas Avenue, and Magsaysay Blvd.
 Greenline Express – Baclaran to SM Fairview.
 Green Frog Hybrid Bus
 Green Star Trans – plying Taytay – Quiapo via Cainta and Ortigas Ave.
 Green Star Express – (Absorbed by South City Express Inc.)
 Guardian Angels Bus Line Inc.
 GPS Transport – under Saint Rose Transit
 Hi-Star Transport Inc.
 Hilltop Tours Inc. (under RBM)
 HM Transport Inc. – plying Alabang to Lawton, SM Fairview to Quiapo, and SM Fairview to Baclaran.
 HR Lines
 Ismael Bus Line ( IBL Inc.) – undermanaged by Pinagrealan Tours and plying NAIA – Grotto via EDSA (They operated before the Navotas – Baclaran via EDSA and San Mateo – Divisoria via Aurora Blvd.)
 Jackpherlyn Transport
 Jasper Jean Liner Inc. – from Pala-Pala to Navotas and Pala-Pala to SM Fairview
 Jayross Lucky Seven Tours – from Baclaran/Alabang to SM Fairview/Grotto/Tungko/Palmera
 Jell Trans Inc.
 Jetbus Travel and Tours (under CEM Trans Group)
 JFT Liner
 Joanna Jesh Transport – plies FTI to Navotas
 Joben's Bus Express
 JoyBus Transport
 Joyselle Express Inc.
 JMA Transport
 JMK Liner
 JNL Paet Transport Co. 
 JRMS Goldensky Transport Inc. – plying Malanday (Valenzuela) – Alabang (Muntinlupa) via EDSA, Bicutan and Sucat or Skyway.
 JRMS Transport
 Juaymah Maureen Transport – founded by Oscar Mababangloob, it operates from Alabang in Muntinlupa and Pacita in San Pedro, Laguna going to Lawton via SLEX Osmena Highway, Quirino Avenue, and Taft Avenue. (franchise taken over by South City Express Inc.)
 Kellen Transport – plies Grotto To Baclaran
 Kelly Transport
 Kingsam Express – plies Alabang/Baclaran to Malanday
 Laguna Starbus (Starbus) – plies Alabang/Baclaran to Malanday (sister company of Five Star)
 Lippad Trans – plies Alabang/Baclaran to SM Fairview
 Lorna Express – plies Indang To Lawton/Pasay
 Luzon Bus Inc. – sister company of Santrans. Operated by Esmeraldo P. Santos with operation of Sapang Palay to Baclaran, Sapang Palay to Baclaran via Marilao, and some 11 units of Mersan (Yutong) with operation of Sapang Palay to LRT Ayala and some units of BBTSC with operation of Sapang Palay to Sta Cruz, Manila
 MAC Lines Inc. – plying Montalban – Divisoria via San Mateo, Aurora Blvd.
 Ma-fel Transit Corporation – plies Baclaran To Grotto,San Jose del Monte
 Mannrose Liner Inc. – plies Baclaran to SM Faiview
 Magicline Express Corporation – plies Sapang Palay To Baclaran And Palmera, San Jose del Monte To Baclaran
 Malanday Metro Link – plies Malanday, Valenzuela to Alabang and Baclaran.
 Maluto Transportation and Travel Corp. – (also known as Igan The Friendly Bus) – plying Alabang (South Station) – Plaza Lawton via Las Piñas and Coastal Road
 Mangie Transport – sister company of Precious Grace Transport
 Marikina Auto Line Transport Corporation (MALTC) – plies (Montalban – Baclaran via EDSA, Ayala, Aurora Blvd.), (San Mateo – Baclaran via EDSA, Ayala, Commonwealth Ave., Batasan Road), and (Navotas – Baclaran via EDSA, Ayala)
 Marthel Transport Inc. (former A. Prado)
 Mayamy Transport Corporation – plies A Same Route Of His Sister Company (Magicline Express Corporation)
 McArthur Express – operated by JMA Transport/Kingsam Express
 Mersan Snow White Transport Corp.
 Mersan (Subsidiary of Santrans)
 Metro Manila Bus Co. (MMBC) – owned by JAC Liner Inc., it plies the Baclaran – SM Fairview (via EDSA) and Baclaran – SM Fairview (via Quaipo).
 MJ Sunville Transport
 NAIA Metro Link – from NAIA to SM Fairview and NAIA to Malanday.
 MSJ Tours
 NAFTI Transport – formerly part of Cher Transport, plying FTI – Navotas via EDSA
 Nathaniel Bus Line – Plying Asturias – Ayala Avenue route from PVP Liner
 Newman Goldliner Inc. – plying from Baclaran to Fairview.
 Nicholas Albert Transport
 Nuestra Senora Del Carmen Transport – Plying from Baclaran in Paranaque City, Ayala in Makati and Cubao in Quezon City to the municipalities of Bocaue and Sta. Maria, Bulacan via NLEX
 N.S. Transport Services, Inc.
 Original Transport Service And Multi Purpose Cooperative (OTSMPC)
 Our Vineyard Transport Corp. (formerly Aerobus)
 Pamana Transport Services Inc. – plies Baclaran to Malanday.
 Pandacan Transport Service Inc.
 Paña Liner (Paña Bus Liner)
 Pascual Liner Inc.
 Philippians Bus Line Inc. – sister company of Newman Goldliner. Plying from Grotto to Baclaran.
 Phil. Touristers Inc. – Subsidiary of JAM Liner – Plying Pacita – Navotas via EDSA
 Pitbull Bus Transport Corporation (PBT Corp.) – From FTI to Navotas.
 Precious Grace Transport – plies from Naia to Malanday and Naia to Grotto
 P2P Bus (Premium Point-to-Point Bus Service, formerly Express Connect) – a joint venture between private city bus companies (Froehlich Tours, RRCG Transport System, MetroExpress Connect and Ube Express) DOTr and LTFRB with a fleet of "premium" express bus service plying around TriNoMa, Ayala Center, SM MOA, Mandaluyong and Alabang Town Center in Muntinlupa
 Prince McKhaine Transport – formerly Divine Transport, Inc.
 Princess Youhan And Chrisa Transport
 PVP Liner
 Reinalyn Bus Lines Corp. – formerly ALTRANSCO, it operates in Las Piñas & Muntinlupa, plying route of Alabang (Muntinlupa) – Plaza Lawton (Manila) via Las Piñas, Coastal Road
 Rainbow Express Inc.
 RBM Grand Rally Trans, Inc.
 Regal Starliner – Plying Amadeo to Park N' Ride,Lawton
 Renan Transit
 Rizal MetroLink Inc. – plies from Quiapo to Tanay, Rizal via Antipolo
 Roval Transport Corp.
 ROV Transport – plies Navotas to Baclaran via EDSA Ayala
 RRCG Transport – a bus company that operated in city & provincial, plying Alabang – Navotas via EDSA, Baclaran – SM City Fairview via EDSA Ayala Taytay/Cainta – Quiapo via Ortigas Ave. and Siniloan – PICC via EDSA – Ayala, Tanay. Owned and operated by EMBC and Rizal Metrolink Inc.
 RS Master Inc. – owned by Northstar Transport Inc.
 SST (Severino Santos Transit) – plies Baclaran To Sapang Palay via Edsa and Santa Cruz to Sapang Palay via A. Bonifacio Ave./Nlex/Marilao
 Safeway Bus Lines Inc.
 Saint Rose Transit
 San Agustin – owned by Santiaguel and TAS Trans Group of Companies, plies from Dasma/Nasugbu/Mendez/Alabang/Pilar to Plaza Lawton
 Seven Sky Express Liner Corp. (formerly Malanday Gold Express Corp.)
 Shanine and Pauline (formerly Erwin Express and Las Ninas) plying from Gil Puyat LRT Station in Pasay and Ayala in Makati to the municipalities of Bocaue, Sta. Maria, Norzagaray and Angat in Bulacan via NLEX
 Shem Transport
 St. Martin of Tours Trailways Inc. – sister company of Pamana Transport Services Inc. Plies the same route.
 Sta. Rita Transport Inc.
 Stargreen Line Incorporated – plies Pacita,San Pedro To Novaliches, Quezon City
 Santrans Inc. – from Sapang Palay to Baclaran via Commonwealth, Sapang Palay to Sta.Cruz via Marilao Exit, and Sapang Palay to Baclaran via Marilao Exit.
 Stella Mae Star Bus
 SVS Southlink Express
 Taguig Metro Link – from Taguig to Fairview.
 TAS Trans Corp. – plying from Alabang/Pilar (Muntinlupa/Las Piñas) – Lawton/Santa Cruz (Manila)
 Tessele One Liner Inc. (former Delta Transport Inc.) – now under DSN Transport
 Thelman Transit Inc. – sister company of Armi Josh
 Ube Express
 Unicab Transport
 Universal Guiding Star Bus Line Corp. – sister company of Everlasting Bus Co., Inc.
 V-1 Bus Line
 Valenzuela Transport Service Cooperative
 Vil 5000 Incorporated
 Valisno Express – sister company of Gasat Express and also has a Provincial Operation from Cubao to Iloilo
 Viofel Transport Incorporated – plies Baclaran/Alabang to SM Fairview via Quiapo/Lawton
 Voyager Express Liner
 Worthy Transport Inc. (under HM Transport)
 Yash And Mckhaine Transport Inc.
 Yohance Express Inc. – from Alabang to Novaliches via C5, Pacita to Novaliches via Malinta Exit and FTI to Navotas (under CEM Trans Group).

Defunct bus lines

 Aladdin Transit Corporation
 Benguet Auto Line – a bus company under Philippine National Railways, with a train connection plies from Rosario, La Union to Baguio via Kennon Road. It was founded in 1906 as the mail carrier of the Bureau of Posts. At its height it was operating 150 buses plus 50 freight trucks.
 Batangas Laguna Tayabas Bus Company (BLTBCO) – formed in 1918 and was one of the most dominant bus companies until it became bankrupt in the early 2000s. Now revived and operated by Del Monte Motor Works under the name DLTBCo. Plies to Bicol, Batangas and Visayas.
 C.A Rodriguez Lines – Owned and operated by Carmen A. Rodriguez Plied to Lawton – Cavite City. Sister company of Saint Anthony (now under San Agustin Transport Corporation), R.A Rodriguez Lines, City Rama Bus Corp, Car San Juan Transport.
 California Bus Lines
 Claro Trans – operated by JFT Liner plying from Alabang to SM Fairview via Lagro
 Crow Transport (Now BSC(Batman Starexpress Corporation))
 Desert Fox
 D' Rough Riders Inc. – acquired and now operated by Sugbo Transit under Yanson Group of Bus Companies.
 Dimple Star Transport – plying Iloilo – España/Cubao/Pasay and Alabang – Lawton via Skyway for city operations. Franchise revoked after a road mishap in Occidental Mindoro.
 Don Mariano Transit Corp. – It plies from Novaliches to Pacita and Baclaran via EDSA – Mindanao Avenue. Franchise revoked due accident along Skyway.
 EJRC Marikina Transit
 Elena Liner – plies Baclaran to Grotto (franchise revoked)
 EMC Transportation Inc. – was once a major bus company in northern Luzon until it went bankrupt in mid-2008 and was bought by Northstar Transport. It offers daily trips from Manila to Cagayan Valley vice versa.
 Fides Express Inc. – plying Navotas – Baclaran via EDSA and Montalban – Divisoria via San Mateo, Aurora Blvd.
 Footprints
 Gloren Transport – plying from Baclaran to SM Farview via Lagro. Now renamed ROV Trans.
 GM Tours – plying Caticlan – Iloilo route. Now taken by YGBC Ceres Liner.
 Golden Highway Transit Inc.
 Grand Star
 JB Line Bicol Express – plied to Bicol. Now reduced to a jeepney company, that plies Sorsogon City – Gubat, Sorsogon route.
 JKJ Express – operated by Kellen Transport and former sister company of CHER Transport Corp. Now absorb to Earth Star Express
 J.S. Vergara Lines (Now San Agustin Transport Corporation)
 Kapalaran Bus Lines – A bus company that plies in Sta. Cruz, Laguna to Lawton or LRT Buendia and Infanta, Quezon to Legarda.
 King of Kings
 Metro Manila Transit Corp. (MMTC) – the first bus company owned by the Philippine government under the Marcos regime, established in 1981 during the Iran–Iraq War but the operation was crippled by the EDSA People Power Revolution in 1986, and later became bankrupt in 1995. On the defunct MMTC shattered into four bus companies – United Workers Transport Corp. (Went bankrupt in 2009), DCOMMP (Drivers, Conductors, Mechanics Multipurpose) Transport Service Cooperative, Filcomtrans (went bankrupt in 1999), and Fastrans (went bankrupt in 2007).
 MRC Golden Star Transport Inc. (formerly Northstar) – It started operating in Cagayan Valley and Apayao province in 2008 when it bought the franchises of the defunct EMC Transportation Inc. and Dalmatian Lines. Now under Northern Luzon Bus Line.
 Lillian Express Inc. – a bus company based in Dipolog City in the Philippines. It served bus routes to the Zamboanga Peninsula. Its buses and route network were merged with Rural Transit and Bachelor Express after it was bought out completely by the Yanson Group of Companies in 2005.
 Luzon Bus Line – a bus company under Philippine National Railways plies to Bicol Region
 Marlea Transport – undermanaged by Jayross Lucky Seven Tours
 MGP Trans – (franchise revoked)
 Pangasinan Transportation Company (PANTRANCO) – a bus company plying to Pangasinan.
 Panda Coach Tours and Transport – revoked due to the Tanay accident.
 PNR Motor Service – a bus company under Philippine National Railways with subsidiaries Bengued Auto Line and the Cavite Line Transportation whole of Luzon. The company has so far invested P24.22 million for the acquisition of 154 bus units now operating in the whole of Luzon.
 Philippine Corinthian Liner Inc. 
 Panda Transit Express (under Jayross)
 Ramtrans Inc
 Roval Tours
 R.A Rodriguez Lines – plies to Lawton – Cavite, City. Sister company of Saint Anthony (now under San Agustin Transport Corporation), C.A Rodriguez Lines, City Rama Bus Corp, Car San Juan Transport.
 Royal Eagle – Its Santiago City route now operated by Five Star, and the Apalit route which is now operated by First North Luzon Transit.
 Sampaguita Auto Transport – plies Pacita Complex to Novaliches via Malinta Exit. now taken by Yohance Express and StarGreen Line.
 South Luzon Crown Transport (Now BSC(Batman Starexpress Corporation))
 Super 5 – Its subsidiary of Grand Courier that plies to Pasay/Cubao, Surigao City & Davao via Leyte
 Tacurong Express – plies Davao – Tacurong via Makilala. Now taken to Yellow Bus Line.
 Trifmann Liner
 TRITRAN
 Weena Express Inc. – former MINTRANCO under Valdevieso Group alongside North Cotabato Transport Co. Inc., and People's Transport Corp. Now operated by Yanson Group of Bus Companies under the name of Mindanao Star Bus Transport Inc.

P2P

In addition to regular buses that serves the commuters, P2P Premium Bus Service is an initiative by DOTr, LTFRB and MMDA for Point to Point commercial bus services within Metro Manila, specially along EDSA, which adds more convenience for the passengers as it provides non-stop services around the metropolis.

 Froehlich Tours
SM City North EDSA (Quezon City) to SM Megamall (Mandaluyong) (double decker service)
Trinoma (Quezon City) to Glorietta 5 (Makati) (double decker service)
HM Transport
Robinsons Galleria (Quezon City) to Glorietta 3 (Makati)
Robinsons Novaliches (Quezon City) to Glorietta 3 (Makati)
Alabang Town Center (Muntinlupa) to Market! Market! (Taguig)
TAS Trans, Corp.
Nuvali (Sta. Rosa) to Makati
RRCG Transport
Alabang Town Center (Muntinlupa) to Greenbelt 1 (Makati) 
Ayala Malls South (Muntinlupa) to Greenbelt 5 (Makati) 
Robinsons Galleria to Robinsons Place Antipolo
Greenbelt 5 to SM City Masinag (Antipolo)
Cubao, Quezon City to Robinsons Place Antipolo
Metro Express
Vista Mall Daang Hari Bacoor to Starmall Alabang (Muntinlupa)
Camella Homes Dasma Highway (Dasmariñas) to Starmall Alabang (Muntinlupa)
Vista Mall Daang Hari Bacoor to Makati CBD (Trasierra St.) via Daang Hari, MCX, Skyway
Robinsons Place Dasmariñas (Dasmariñas) to Makati CBD (Trasierra St.) via Daang Hari, MCX, Skyway, Vista Ave.
Vista Mall Taguig to Makati CBD (Trasierra St.) via Ayala Ave., Circuit Makati
Vista Mall Taguig to Starmall EDSA-SHAW via Robinsons Pioneer & Robinsons Galleria
Delta Neo Solutions (DNS)
U.P. Town Center to Glorietta 3
Sucat to Glorietta 3
PITX to Makati
UBE Express
Ninoy Aquino International Airport to Robinsons Place Manila (Manila)
Ninoy Aquino International Airport to Victory Liner Pasay Terminal
Ninoy Aquino International Airport to Park Square Ayala Center (Makati)
Ninoy Aquino International Airport to SM Mall of Asia (Pasay)
Ninoy Aquino International Airport to Nuvali (Sta. Rosa)
Genesis Transport
Trinoma (Quezon City) to Clark International Airport, Angeles, Pampanga (with JoyBus)
Baguio to Clark International Airport
Lubao to Clark International Airport
Baguio to NAIA Terminal 1/NAIA Terminal 3
NAIA Terminal to Clark International Airport
Victory Liner
Clark International Airport to Subic (SBMA)/Olongapo City, Zambales
Clark International Airport to Dagupan
Precious Grace Transport
Robinsons Place Malolos to North Avenue (Quezon City)
Santa Maria, Bulacan to North Avenue/TriNoma (Quezon City)
Plaridel, Bulacan to North Avenue/TriNoma (Quezon City)
San Agustin Transport Service, Corp.
Pilar to Makati
Noveleta to Makati
Imus to Makati
Pangasinan Solid North Transport
Baguio City to PITX
Baguio City to NAIA Terminal 3
ALPS The Bus
SM City Lipa (Lipa City) to SM Megamall (Mandaluyong) (double decker service)

Gallery

See also

 Taxicabs of the Philippines
 Transportation in the Philippines

References

 
Philippines
Bus companies